Overseas is an album by pianist Tommy Flanagan and his trio, recorded in 1957. It was Flanagan's debut album as a leader and was made in Sweden whilst touring with J. J. Johnson.

Recording and music 
Pianist Tommy Flanagan was touring Europe as part of trombonist J. J. Johnson's band in 1957 when he was given the chance to lead a recording session for the first time. Flanagan added bassist Wilbur Little and drummer Elvin Jones for the session in Stockholm on August 15, and this album was the result. Most of the compositions were Flanagan originals.

Releases and reception 

Overseas was released by Prestige Records. Very similar selections of tracks were also released as Tommy Flanagan Trio by Metronome and as Trio Overseas by Prestige. All of the tracks from the session were later issued by DIW as The Complete Overseas.

The Penguin Guide to Jazz complimented Flanagan's touch and "trim melodic ideas".

Track listing 
All pieces by Tommy Flanagan unless otherwise noted.

"Relaxin' at Camarillo" (Charlie Parker) – 3:21
"Chelsea Bridge" (Billy Strayhorn) – 3:46
"Eclypso" – 6:00
"Beat's Up" – 4:22
"Skål Brothers" – 2:33
"Little Rock" – 7:08
"Verdandi" – 2:15
"Dalarna" – 4:44
"Willow Weep for Me" (Ann Ronell) – 6:29

Bonus tracks on CD reissue:
"Dalarna" [Take 2] – 4:36
"Verdandi" [Take 2] – 2:11
"Willow Weep for Me" [Take 1] – 6:17

August 15, 1957 at Metronome Studio, Stockholm

Personnel 
 Tommy Flanagan – piano
 Wilbur Little – bass
 Elvin Jones – drums

References 

1958 albums
Prestige Records albums
Tommy Flanagan albums
Elvin Jones albums
Albums produced by Bob Weinstock